Dhania is a census town in the Amdanga CD block in the Barasat Sadar subdivision in the North 24 Parganas district in the Indian state of West Bengal. It is renown as Gadamara.

Geography

Location

Area overview
The area covered in the map alongside is largely a part of the north Bidyadhari Plain. located in the lower Ganges Delta. The country is flat. It is a little raised above flood level and the highest ground borders the river channels.54.67% of the people of the densely populated area lives in the urban areas and 45.33% lives in the rural  areas.

Note: The map alongside presents some of the notable locations in the subdivision. All places marked in the map are linked in the larger full screen map.

Demographics
 India census, Dhania had a population of 6659; of this, 3403 are male, 3256 female. Dhania has an average literacy rate of 81%, higher than the national average of 74.04%.

Transport
National Highway 12 (old numbering NH 34) passes through Dhania.

Infrastructure
As per District Census Handbook 2011, Dhania covered an area of 3.6511 km2. It had 2-3 primary school, 1 high school and 2 college. The nearest hospital was 6 km away, the nearest dispensary/ health center was 4 km away, the nearest family welfare center was 6 km away, the nearest maternity and child welfare clinic was 7 km away and the nearest maternity home was 6 km away.

Healthcare
North 24 Parganas district has been identified as one of the areas where ground water is affected by arsenic contamination.

See also
  Map of Amdanga CD Block on Page 339 of District Census Handbook.

References

Cities and towns in North 24 Parganas district